Ximengite is a phosphate mineral discovered in and named for the Ximeng tin-mining district in China.

References

Phosphate minerals
Bismuth minerals
Trigonal minerals
Minerals in space group 152 or 154